Antique Epigraphs is a ballet made on New York City Ballet by ballet master Jerome Robbins to an orchestrated version of Debussy's Six épigraphes antiques, L131, for piano, four hands, from 1914:
“Pour invoquer Pan, dieu du vent d'été”
“Pour un tombeau sans nom”
“Pour que la nuit soit propice”
“Pour la danseuse aux crotales”
“Pour l'égyptienne”
“Pour remercier la pluie au matin”

and his Syrinx, L129, a melody for unaccompanied flute from 1913. Six épigraphes antiques were originally written to accompany Pierre Louys' Les Chansons de Bilitis, prose poetry which was purported to be a translation of freshly discovered autobiographical verse by a lover and contemporary of Sappho. The premiere took place on February 2, 1984, at the New York State Theater, Lincoln Center, with costumes by Florence Klotz and lighting by Jennifer Tipton.

Casts

Original 

 
Kyra Nichols
Stephanie Saland
Helene Alexopoulos
Victoria Hall
Maria Calegari
Simone Schumacher
Jerri Kumery
Florence Fitzgerald

Articles 
NY Times by Anna Kisselgoff, February 12, 1984

Reviews 

  
NY Times by Anna Kisselgoff, February 4, 1984
NY Times by Jack Anderson, February 21, 1984
 
NY Times by Jack Anderson, June 18, 1984
NY Times by Gia Kourlas, May 17, 2008

Ballets by Jerome Robbins
Ballets to the music of Claude Debussy
New York City Ballet repertory
1984 ballet premieres
Ballets designed by Jennifer Tipton
Ballets designed by Florence Klotz